Business as usual was a policy followed by the British government, under Prime Minister H. H. Asquith, during the early years of the First World War. Its fundamental belief was that in order to maintain a stable and functioning country, it was necessary to continue society in the same manner as before the war; in other words, that civilians should think of the war as "business as usual". The underlying assumption was that a morale-eroding change in behaviour equated to a victory for the enemy.

The term itself is attributed to Winston Churchill, then a prominent "New Liberal".

See also 
Normalcy

References 

United Kingdom in World War I
H. H. Asquith
Public policy in the United Kingdom
Winston Churchill